Riceton is a hamlet in the Canadian province of Saskatchewan.

History 
The first grain elevator was built in 1913. By 1968 Riceton's population was 128.

Name 
According to a collectively-researched 1968 publication on Saskatchewan place name origins, Riceton was named after J. S. Rice who owned the land on which the town was incorporated.

Demographics 

References

Designated places in Saskatchewan
Lajord No. 128, Saskatchewan
Organized hamlets in Saskatchewan
Division No. 6, Saskatchewan